Inga Thorsson (1915–1994) was a Swedish politician (Social Democrat).

She was born to Nils Eduard Sjöbäck, the manager of a cinema for Svensk Filmindustri (SF). She worked as an association secretary for the Swedish Social Democratic Party's women's association.

She was an expert of the International Labour Organization (ILO) in Geneva in 1950–1952.

She was the chairperson of the Social Democratic Women in Sweden in 1952–1964. She was an MP in 1957–1958. She was the first woman city commissioner for social welfare in Stockholm in 1958–1962.

She was Sweden's Ambassador to Israel in 1964–1966 and 1967–1970, and Ambassador for the United Nations in 1966 and 1970–1982. She was chair of the Swedish disarmament delegation in Geneva in 1974–1982. She was head of the United Nations' section of social development in New York.

References

1915 births
1994 deaths
20th-century Swedish politicians
20th-century Swedish women politicians
Swedish social democrats
Swedish feminists
Ambassadors of Sweden to Israel
Members of the Riksdag 1970–1973
Members of the Riksdag 1974–1976
Members of the Riksdag 1976–1979